Axford is an unincorporated community in Grays Harbor County, in the U.S. state of Washington.

History
A post office called Axford was established in 1888, and remained in operation until 1904. The community was named after one Mr. Axford, a pioneer settler.

References

Unincorporated communities in Grays Harbor County, Washington
Unincorporated communities in Washington (state)